STDU Explorer is a file manager for previewing and managing PDF, DjVu, Comic Book Archive (CBR or CBZ), XPS and image file formats such as BMP, GIF, JPEG, PNG, PSD and WMF. It works under Microsoft Windows, and is free for non-commercial use.

Features 
STDU Explorer supports standard operations such as cut, copy, paste, move, delete, rename, context menu integration and tree views of folders. The program has a preview pane for flipping through multipage files, it can generate adjustable thumbnail previews of the images and the content of PDF e-books.

See also
Comparison of file managers

References

External links 
 

File managers
Windows-only freeware